The Syracuse Junction Railroad, established in 1873 and opened in 1874, was built to route two freight tracks of a four-track system around Syracuse, New York.

History

Syracuse Junction Railroad was established on June 9, 1873, by the New York Central and Hudson River Railroad Company. The line opened for business on November 16, 1874. It was leased back to the New York Central and Hudson River Railroad Company on April 10, 1875, as a legal formality and changed to New York Central Railroad in 1914.

By 1950, the line was still in use and routed through the Carrier Corporation plant in Syracuse where air conditioners were loaded and shipped.

References

Predecessors of the New York Central Railroad
Defunct railroads in Syracuse, New York
Defunct New York (state) railroads
Railway companies established in 1873
Railway companies disestablished in 1879